"If I Were King of the Forest" is a song from the 1939 film The Wizard of Oz, with music by Harold Arlen and lyrics by E.Y. Harburg.

The comic number is sung by the Cowardly Lion played by Bert Lahr during the scene at the Emerald City, when the Lion, Dorothy (with Toto), Tin Woodsman and Scarecrow are waiting to learn whether the Wizard will grant them an audience.  Lahr employs a spoken interlude during the number, in which the rest of the group ask him how he would deal with other powerful animals if he were king, for example:
Supposin’ you met an elephant?
I'd wrap him up in cellophant!

The song contains the line "What makes the Hottentot so Hot?" a phrase that refers to the Khoikhoi tribe of Africa.
 
Two portions of the song were cut for reasons of time: a brief middle stanza in which the other characters echo the verse that preceded it and Lahr first proclaims himself "Monarch of all I survey" (a line repeated later in the song), and the final stanza which ended with the Lion proclaiming "If I...were...king!" (two versions were recorded: one where Lahr himself unsuccessfully tries to hit the high note on the final word, and instead does so in his character's trademark growl; the other has the final high note powerfully delivered by soprano Georgia Stark, who was paid $25 for her involvement).

The complete version of the song can be heard on the deluxe 1995 soundtrack release from Rhino Records, along with the less extensive single-disc release. Additionally, the complete version was used for the 1996 soundtrack recording of The Wizard of Oz in Concert: Dreams Come True, also from Rhino. In this version, Nathan Lane (who performs as the Lion) has an addition to the lyrics which is "Not queen, not duke, not prince...or the Artist Formerly known as Prince".

The song has been used in several of the stage versions of The Wizard of Oz. In addition, Tom Hardy sings it while playing the title role of Al Capone in the 2020 biopic film Capone.

See also
 Musical selections in The Wizard of Oz
The Merry Old Land of Oz
The Jitterbug (deleted song)

Further reading
Sherman, Fraser A.  The Wizard of Oz Catalog.  McFarland and Company, 2005. 
Swartz, Mark Evan.  "Oz Before the Rainbow: L. Frank Baum's 'The Wonderful Wizard of Oz' on Stage and Screen to 1939". The Johns Hopkins University Press, 2000

References

External links

Production and synopsis listing, Tams-Witmark
Production and plot (RSC Version) at guidetomusicaltheatre.com

1939 songs
Songs from The Wizard of Oz (1939 film)
Songs with lyrics by Yip Harburg
Songs with music by Harold Arlen